Forever Friends is the second studio album by Dutch-English pop group Caught in the Act. It was released by ZYX Music on 13 May 1996 in German-speaking Europe. It was released in the Philippines by Dyna Products Philippines (now Dyna Music), under license from ToCo International. The album peaked at number 2 on the German Albums Chart and reached the tiop five in Austria and Switzerland.

Track listing
Adapted from album booklet.

Charts

Weekly charts

Year-end charts

Certifications

Release history

References

1996 albums
Caught in the Act albums
Albums produced by Steve Mac